Wytyczno  is a village in the administrative district of Gmina Urszulin, within Włodawa County, Lublin Voivodeship, in eastern Poland.

It was the site of the Battle of Wytyczno between Polish and Soviet forces in October 1939.

References

Wytyczno